Weather or Not is the third solo studio album by American rapper and producer Evidence. It was released on January 26, 2018 via Rhymesayers Entertainment. Production was handled by several record producers, including Alchemist, Budgie, DJ Babu, DJ Premier, Nottz, Samiyam, Twiz the Beat Pro, and Evidence himself. It also features guest appearances from Catero, Defari, Jonwayne, Khrysis, Krondon, Mach-Hommy, Rakaa, Rapsody, Slug, Styles P, and The Alchemist.

This album is a follow-up to his 2011 album, Cats & Dogs, and is the final entry in his "Weatherman" series.

Singles and music videos 
Prior to the release, three singles and videos were released: "Throw It All Away", "Jim Dean" and "10,000 Hours". Photography for the album cover and a 12-page booklet was done by photographer Steven Vanasco. Evidence came to know him through his Instagram page and they became friends. Vanasco also directed the videos for "Throw It All Away" and "10,000 Hours". The video for "Jim Dean" was directed by Evidence's long time friend and collaborator Jason Goldwatch.

Commercial performance 
Upon its release, the album debuted at number 187 on the US Billboard 200.

Track listing

Charts

References

External links 

2018 albums
Evidence (musician) albums
Rhymesayers Entertainment albums
Albums produced by Nottz
Albums produced by DJ Premier
Albums produced by Evidence (musician)
Albums produced by the Alchemist (musician)